Ančka Gošnik Godec (born 5 June 1927) is a Slovene illustrator. She has illustrated over 120 children's books as well as school textbooks.

Life
Gošnik Godec was born in Celje in 1927. She studied at the Academy of Fine Arts in Ljubljana and lives and works in Ljubljana. She won the Levstik Award for her illustrations twice, in 1960 and 1964, as well as the same award for lifetime achievement in illustration in 2001. She was also nominated for the Hans Christian Andersen Award.

References

External links

Slovenian illustrators
Living people
1927 births
Artists from Celje
Levstik Award laureates
University of Ljubljana alumni
Slovenian women artists
Slovenian women illustrators
Slovenian children's book illustrators